Samuel Smith Harris (September 14, 1841 – August 21, 1888) was the second Bishop of Michigan in the Episcopal Church in the United States of America.

Biography 
Harris was born on September 14, 1841, in Autauga County, Alabama. He graduated in law from the University of Alabama in 1859. Later he enlisted in the 3rd Regiment Alabama Infantry in 1861. On December 19, the same year, Harris married Mary Gindrat Pickett with whom he had seven children. After the war he left for New York to practice supreme law. He also commenced his studies in theology after which he was ordained deacon on February 10, 1869, and then priest on June 30, 1869, on both occasions by Bishop Richard Hooker Wilmer of Alabama. He served in several churches in Alabama, Georgia, Louisiana and Illinois. He graduated with a Doctor of Divinity in 1874 from the College of William & Mary and his LLD from the University of Alabama in 1879.

Episcopacy 
In 1879 Harris was elected Bishop of Michigan. He was consecrated on September 17, 1879, in St Paul's Cathedral in Detroit. He served as the first editor of The Living Church with John Fulton, and wrote several books, including The Dignity of Man, Christianity and Civil Society, Thoughts on Life, Death, and Immortality, and Shelton, a novel.

Death
In 1888 he traveled to England to preach in Winchester Cathedral. Whilst there he suffered a stroke and died a few days later on August 21, 1888. His funeral took place in Winchester Cathedral and presided by Edward White Benson Primate of All England and Archbishop of Canterbury. His body was brought back to Detroit and buried in Woodmere Cemetery in Detroit, however he was exhumed and transferred to Elmwood Cemetery in 1900.

References

External links
 

1841 births
1888 deaths
People from Autauga County, Alabama
Clergy from Detroit
19th-century American Episcopalians
Episcopal bishops of Michigan
19th-century American clergy
Burials at Elmwood Cemetery (Detroit)